is a 2006 video game for the PlayStation Portable. It is a sequel to Boxer's Road for the PlayStation. It was developed by Grand Prix and published by Ertain Corporation.

Gameplay 
The game controls by having the d-pad to move closer or farther away, or to side step left or right, all relative to your opponent. The face buttons are all attacks, with each corresponding to a right or left hook or jab. Left trigger changes punches into uppercuts, and right trigger allows you to bob and weave. The game features either a first person or third person viewpoint options.

Development 
The game was developed by Grand Prix Games. Most of the devs from the original game, worked on the sequel.

The game worked with the Japan Professional Boxing Association (JPBA) and includes 77 gyms, and 139 boxers using their real names to be featured in the game.

Release 
The game was released on September 28, 2006 for the PlayStation Portable.

Reception 
Famitsu gave the game a score of 25 out of 40.

Notes

References

External links 
 Boxer's Road 2: The Real at GameFAQs

2006 video games
Boxing video games
PlayStation Portable games
PlayStation Portable-only games
Japan-exclusive video games
Video games developed in Japan